Kitrina Douglas (born 6 September 1960) is an English ex-professional golfer who played on the Ladies European Tour.

Douglas won the British Ladies Amateur in 1982 and played in the 1982 Great Britain & Ireland Curtis Cup team. She played professionally on the Ladies European Tour, where she won eight times and was a member of the 1992 European Solheim Cup team.

Once her competitive career was over, Douglas became a BBC Sport Online golf columnist and in 2004 Douglas was awarded a Doctor of Philosophy (PhD) in achievement psychology of international women golfers from the University of Bristol.

Professional wins (8)

Ladies European Tour wins (8)
1984 (2) Ford Ladies' Classic, Höganäs Sweden Open
1986 (1) Mitsubishi Colt Cars Jersey Open
1987 (1) Hennessy Cognac Ladies Cup
1989 (2) St Moritz Classic, Godiva European Masters
1991 (1) Ladies English Open
1992 (1) BMW European Masters

Team appearances
Amateur
European Lady Junior's Team Championship (representing England): 1982 (winners)
Curtis Cup (representing Great Britain & Ireland): 1982
Vagliano Trophy (representing Great Britain & Ireland): 1983 (winners)
European Ladies' Team Championship (representing England): 1983

Professional
Solheim Cup (representing Europe): 1992 (winners)

References

External links
University of Bristol profile

English female golfers
Ladies European Tour golfers
Winners of ladies' major amateur golf championships
Solheim Cup competitors for Europe
English psychologists
Academics of the University of Bristol
1960 births
Living people